José Pauwels (24 June 1928 – 7 July 2012) was a Belgian cyclist. He competed in the 4,000 metres team pursuit event at the 1952 Summer Olympics.

References

External links

1928 births
2012 deaths
Belgian male cyclists
Cyclists at the 1952 Summer Olympics
Olympic cyclists of Belgium
Sportspeople from Sint-Niklaas
Cyclists from East Flanders
20th-century Belgian people